Jaydn Su'a (born 23 October 1997) is a Samoa international rugby league footballer who plays as a  forward for the St George Illawarra Dragons in the NRL.

He previously played for the Brisbane Broncos and South Sydney Rabbitohs in the National Rugby League, and at representative level for Queensland in the State of Origin series.

Background
Su'a was born in Christchurch, New Zealand. He is of Samoan descent and moved to Australia at the age of two.

He attended Marsden State High School and later Anglican Church Grammar School, where he played for their rugby union team. He played his junior rugby league for the Logan Brothers, before being signed by the Canberra Raiders at the age of 13. After two years on a scholarship with the Raiders, he signed with the Brisbane Broncos.

Playing career

Early career
In 2012, Su'a played in the Souths Logan Magpies' Cyril Connell Cup and National Title winning sides as a 15-year-old. In 2013, he represented the Queensland under-16 rugby league team. In 2015, he joined the Brisbane Broncos' NYC team. That year, he represented the Queensland under-18 rugby league team, scoring a try and being named Man of the Match.

2016
On 7 May, Su'a represented the Junior Kangaroos and was named Man of the Match in their win over the Junior Kiwis. In Round 12 of the 2016 NRL season, he made his NRL debut for the Broncos against the Wests Tigers. On 13 July, he captained the Queensland under-20 rugby league team. In September, he was named at second-row in the 2016 NYC Team of the Year. In September, he re-signed with the Broncos on a 2-year contract until the end of 2018.

2017
In the 2017 NRL season, Su'a was limited to only 4 first grade appearances for Brisbane and did not feature in the club's finals campaign.

2018
In the 2018 NRL season, Su'a made 15 appearances for Brisbane, but missed out on playing in the club's finals campaign due to injury.

2019

At the start of the 2019 NRL season, Su'a made 8 appearances for Brisbane as they lost 8 of their first 13 games which was one of the worst beginnings to a season in the club's history.  On 28 June, Su'a signed a two-year contract to join South Sydney in a mid-season switch from Brisbane. Su'a made his debut for South Sydney against Manly-Warringah in Round 17 at ANZ Stadium which ended in a 21–20 victory.

2020 
Throughout the 2020 NRL season, Su'a made 21 appearances for South Sydney, establishing himself as one of the competition's most improved players. Su'a was selected in the Queensland rugby league team for the  2020 State of Origin series. He made his debut in Game One, playing a solid 48 minutes off the bench as Queensland upset New South Wales.

2021 
In the 2021 NRL Season, Su'a reinforced the previous years success, playing an instrumental role that helped the Rabbitohs achieve a Top 4 finish. In Round 8, Su'a scored his first try of the season in a 34-20 point win over the Canberra Raiders. In Round 19, Su'a scored 2 tries against the New Zealand Warriors in a match that saw the Rabbitohs win 60–22.

On 21 July, Su'a signed a three-year deal with St. George Illawarra.

Su'a played a total of 23 games for South Sydney in the 2021 NRL season, including the club's 2021 NRL Grand Final defeat against Penrith.

2022
In Round 1 of the 2022 NRL season, he made his club debut for St. George Illawarra in their 28-16 victory over the New Zealand Warriors.  In Rounds 2 and 3, Su'a was sent to the sin bin in consecutive weeks for dangerous tackles.

Throughout 2022, Su'a played 18 games as the Dragons finished 10th, missing finals for fourth straight season.

In October Su'a was named in the Samoa squad for the 2021 Rugby League World Cup.
Su'a played for Samoa in their 2021 Rugby League World Cup final loss to Australia.

References

External links
South Sydney Rabbitohs profile
Brisbane Broncos profile
Samoa profile

1997 births
Living people
Australian rugby league players
Australian sportspeople of Samoan descent
Samoa national rugby league team players
Brisbane Broncos players
Junior Kangaroos players
Rugby league second-rows
Souths Logan Magpies players
Rugby league centres
Rugby league players from Christchurch
People from Queensland
New Zealand emigrants to Australia
South Sydney Rabbitohs players
Queensland Rugby League State of Origin players
St. George Illawarra Dragons players